The 1968 United States presidential election in Oregon took place on November 5, 1968, as part of the 1968 United States presidential election. Voters chose six representatives, or electors, to the Electoral College, who voted for president and vice president.

Oregon was won by former Vice President Richard Nixon (R–New York), with 49.83% of the popular vote, against Vice President Hubert Humphrey (D–Minnesota), with 43.78% of the popular vote. Independent candidate George Wallace finished with 6.06% of Oregon's popular vote.  As of 2020, this is the last time Oregon and neighboring Washington did not vote for the same presidential candidate.

Nixon's victory was the first of five consecutive Republican victories in the state, as Oregon  would not vote for a Democratic candidate again until Michael Dukakis in 1988. Since then it has become a safe Democratic state.

Results

Results by county

See also
 United States presidential elections in Oregon

Notes

References

Oregon
1968
1968 Oregon elections